Annexation of Crimea may refer to:
Annexation of the Crimean Khanate by the Russian Empire (1783)
Annexation of Crimea by the Russian Federation (2014)

See also
 1954 transfer of Crimea